The 1954 Southern Area League was the first season of the newly named regional third tier of speedway racing in the United Kingdom for Southern British teams. It replaced the defunct Southern League. With most of the Southern League teams moving up to Speedway National League Division Two, six new teams started the season—many of them making their debut in league speedway.

Summary
Three teams finished equal on points at the top but California Poppies from California, Berkshire were champions by the slenderest possible margin of a single race point with all their rivals having an fixture in hand that was never ridden.

Aldershot Shots withdrew mid-season. Ernie Lessiter of Ringwood topped the averages.

Final table

Withdrawal (Record expunged) : Aldershot Shots

Leading Averages

See also
List of United Kingdom Speedway League Champions
Knockout Cup (speedway)

References

Southern Area League
Southern Area League
1954 in speedway